Kali is a municipality in Croatia on Ugljan island in Zadar County. In the 2011 census, there were 1,638 inhabitants, 99.39% of whom were Croats.

Name
The settlement's name is likely derived from cale, a Celtic word for port.

Attractions
Kali is a fishing town with a Mediterranean feeling. The old central part of the town was founded on a hillock around St. Lovre's (St. Lawrence) Church, the patron saint of the town. The famed fishermen's festival takes place under the saint's auspices every year in August.

Notes

Bibliography

External links
 
 Kali-Zadar County Tourist Office

Municipalities of Croatia
Populated places in Zadar County
Ugljan